WBFE (99.1 FM) is an American radio station broadcasting a country music format simulcasting WBFB. Licensed to Bar Harbor, Maine, United States, the station serves the Down East Maine area.  The station is owned by Blueberry Broadcasting.

History
The station was assigned call sign WPRG on March 24, 1988. On May 19, 1992, the station changed its call sign to WLKE; on June 1, it signed on. As of September 28, 2009, it became part of a three station country network based out of Blueberry's Bangor office, simulcasting WBFB and also heard on WMCM. On September 23, 2013, the station took its current WBFE call sign. Prior to September 28, 2009, the station was branded as "Lucky 99.1".

References

External links
Official Website

BFE
Radio stations established in 1992
1992 establishments in Maine
Country radio stations in the United States
Bar Harbor, Maine
Blueberry Broadcasting radio stations